This is a list of gurdwaras in North America. A gurdwara is a Sikh center of worship or temple.

California

District of Columbia

Florida

Illinois

Maryland

Michigan

Missouri

New York

Ohio

Oregon

South Carolina

Tennessee

Wisconsin

See also 
 
List of gurdwaras worldwide

References

External links 
 Global directory of Gurudwara

Lists of religious buildings and structures in the United States
United States
Sikhism-related lists